Derek Thomas Tulk (21 April 1934 – 27 January 2023) was an English first-class cricketer. 

Tulk was born at Southampton in April 1934. He was educated at Taunton's School, where he played for the school cricket team in the Hampshire Schools’ Altham Trophy. He made two appearances in first-class cricket for Hampshire, playing against Gloucestershire in the 1956 County Championship, and Cambridge University in 1957. Playing as a right-arm medium pace bowler, he bowled a total of 16 overs across both matches, but failed to take a wicket. After his brief foray into first-class cricket, Tulk played club cricket for the Old Tauntonians Cricket Club, playing a prominent role in the club's success in the Southern Cricket League during the 1970s. Outside of cricket, he forged a successful career in the insurance industry. Tulk died in Rownhams, Hampshire on 27 January 2023, at the age of 88. He had been unwell for some time. His son, Ian, worked for Hampshire County Cricket Club for over 20 years.

References

External links

1934 births
2023 deaths
Cricketers from Southampton
English cricketers
Hampshire cricketers